Andrei Bîrcă (born 23 March 1988) is a Moldovan male weightlifter, competing in the 77 kg category and representing Moldova at international competitions. He competed at world championships, most recently at the 2010 World Weightlifting Championships.

Major results

References

External links
 
 

1988 births
Living people
Moldovan male weightlifters
Place of birth missing (living people)
Doping cases in weightlifting
Moldovan sportspeople in doping cases